Kissing Is No Sin is a 1926 German silent comedy film directed by Rudolf Walther-Fein and Rudolf Dworsky and starring Xenia Desni, Ellen Plessow, and Livio Pavanelli.

Cast

References

Bibliography

External links

1926 films
1926 comedy films
German comedy films
Films of the Weimar Republic
Films directed by Rudolf Walther-Fein
Films directed by Rudolf Dworsky
German silent feature films
German black-and-white films
Silent comedy films
1920s German films